Kaliganj Assembly constituency is an assembly constituency in Nadia district in the Indian state of West Bengal.

Overview
As per orders of the Delimitation Commission, No. 80 Kaliganj Assembly constituency  is composed of the following: Bara Chandghar. Debagram, Faridpur, Gobra, Hatgachha, Juranpur, Kaliganj, Matiari, Mira I, Mira II, Panighata, Plassey I and Plassey II gram panchayats of Kaliganj community development block.

Kaliganj Assembly constituency is part of No. 12 Krishnanagar (Lok Sabha constituency).

Members of Legislative Assembly

Election results

2021

2011
In the 2011 election, Naseeruddin Ahamed of All India Trinamool Congress defeated his nearest rival Sankar Sarkar of Revolutionary Socialist Party.

 

Sharifuddin Munshi, contesting as an independent candidate, was a rebel Congress candidate.

.# Swing calculated on Congress+Trinamool Congress vote percentages taken together in 2006.

1977-2006
In 2006 and 2001 state assembly elections, Dhananjoy Modak of RSP won the Kaliganj assembly seat defeating his nearest rivals Nasiruddin Ahmed Nasiruddin Ahmed and Abdus Salam Munshi, both of Trinamool Congress, respectively. Contests in most years were multi cornered but only winners and runners are being mentioned. Abdus Salam Munshi of Congress defeated Dhananjoy Modak of RSP in 1996, and Deb Saran Ghosh of RSP in 1991 and 1987. Debsaran Ghosh of RSP defeated Shibsankar Bandopadhyay of Congress in 1982 and S.M.Fazlur Rahman of Janata Party in 1977.

1951–1972
Shib Sankar Bandopdhyay of Congress won in 1972. Mir Fakir Mohammed, Independent, won in 1971. S.M.Fazlur Rahman of Congress won in 1969 and 1967. The Kaliganj seat was not there in 1962 and 1957. In 1962,Nakashipara Assembly constituency was an open seat, S.M.Fazlur Rahman of Congress won it. In 1957, Nakashipara was a joint seat with one reserved for SC. S.M.Fazlur Rahman and Mahananda Halder, both of Congress won. In independent India's first election in 1951, S.M.Fazlur Rahman of Congress won the Kaliganj open seat.

References

Assembly constituencies of West Bengal
Politics of Nadia district